Maurice Alfred McCanlis (17 June 1906 – 27 September 1991) was an English sportsman who played first-class cricket for Oxford University and represented England at rugby union.

Educated at Cranleigh School and St Edmund Hall, Oxford, McCanlis bowled right-arm medium pace and was noted for his out swinging deliveries to right-handers. Most of his first-class matches were with Oxford University and he captained them in the 1928 University Match. He also played two matches for Surrey and one for Gloucestershire during his career.

He was capped twice for the England national rugby union team in the 1931 Five Nations Championship, appearing in their games against Ireland and Wales. He played mainly as a three-quarter and also represented Gloucester and Oxford.

In 1938 and 1940 he made a return to cricket with a couple of Ranji Trophy appearances for Rajputana while he was in India on a teaching job. From 1932 to 1966, McCanlis was a teacher at Cheltenham College.

References

1906 births
1991 deaths
People educated at Cranleigh School
Alumni of St Edmund Hall, Oxford
English cricketers
Gloucestershire cricketers
Oxford University cricketers
Rajasthan cricketers
Surrey cricketers
English rugby union players
England international rugby union players
People from Pershore
Sportspeople from Worcestershire